The Hasandong Formation is an Early Cretaceous (Aptian to Albian) geologic formation in South Korea. It has been dated to the late Aptian and earliest Albian, between 118.0 ± 2.6 Ma and 112.4 ± 1.3 Ma. Dinosaur remains diagnostic to the genus level are among the fossils that have been recovered from the formation. Tracks of the pterosaur ichnospecies Pteraichnus koreanensis have also been recovered from the unit.

Fossil content

Paleofauna 
 Hadongsuchus acerdentis - nomen nudum
 Tyrannosauroidea indet. - "Tooth."
 Carcharodontosauridae indet.
 Chiayusaurus asianensis? (possibly a synonym of Chiayusaurus lacustris) - "Tooth."
 Pukyongosaurus milleniumi - "Cervical and dorsal vertebrae, ribs, limb and girdle elements."
 Hadrosauroidea indet. - "Tooth."
 Pterodactyloidea indet. (belongs to either Boreopteridae or Anhanguerian)
 Dsungaripteridae indet.
 Sinamia sp.
 Sauripes hadongensis - an ichnotaxon (the oldest lizard trackway; shows bipedalism)
 Pteraichnus koreanensis - pterosaur ichnotaxon

Paleoflora 
Thallites (T. yabei) - liverworts
Onychiopsis (O. elongata) - leptosporangiate ferns
Cladophlebis (C. denticulata, C. shinshuensis, C./Eboracia? lobifolia and C./Klukia? koraiensis)
Brachyphyllum (B. japonicum)
Elatocladus (E. tennerima)
Taeniopteris (T.? sp. and cf. T. auriculata) - cycad ferns

See also 
 List of dinosaur-bearing rock formations
 List of stratigraphic units with few dinosaur genera
 Seonso Conglomerate
 Haman Formation

References

Bibliography 
  

Geologic formations of South Korea
Lower Cretaceous Series of Asia
Cretaceous South Korea
Albian Stage
Aptian Stage
Mudstone formations
Shale formations
Sandstone formations
Fluvial deposits
Ichnofossiliferous formations
Paleontology in South Korea